Lucia Nifontova-Saurama (born ; 30 August 19136 April 1987), better known as Lucia Nifontova, was a Finnish ballet dancer and Finland’s first prima ballerina assoluta. In the 1930s and 40s she and her partner  were the leading dancers in Finland and among the foremost artists in Finnish ballet of all time periods. Her performances of Odette and Odile in Swan Lake were especially noted for their artistic accomplishment and emotional interpretation.

Biography

Early life and education

Nifontova was born in Helsinki, then part of the Russian Empire, to Andrei Ivanovich Nifontov (18761962), a Russian imperial civil servant, and Alexandra Nifontova (18791945) of Tuusula. She was called Lucia both at home and in public.

She spent six years at a Russian-language elementary school in Helsinki, after which she entered the Hilma Liiman Dance School and then continued her studies at the Helsinki Dance Institute. There she studied under ballerinas from the Mariinsky Theatre Elisabeth Apostoli and Mary Paischeff. Her first public performance was at age 12 in Hollandsflickan ("The Little Dutch Girl") at Helsinki’s Swedish Theatre.

Finnish National Ballet

Dancer and choreographer  noticed Nifontova’s talent and brought her to the Finnish National Ballet, over which he was the ballet master. There she studied under Gé and other Russian immigrants such as Lyubov Yegorova, Mathilde Kschessinska, Nikolai Legat and Olga Preobrajenska. In 1928 she danced the lead role of Clara in the first performance of The Nutcracker outside Russia. Dancing the role of the Nutcracker Prince was Martikainen, who was to be paired with Nifontova in numerous productions up through the year of his death in 1946. Over the next seven years she danced lead roles in The Sleeping Beauty, Petrushka, Le Spectre de la rose, Swan Lake, Coppélia, Le Bal and Die Puppenfee. She also appeared in a few Finnish films, usually in dancing scenes.

Ballet Russe de Monte-Carlo

During the global depression of the 1930s the Finnish National Ballet suffered great difficulties in paying its artists, and in 1935 Nifontova and Martikainen, along with Gé, Kschessinska and Preobrajenska, left Finland and joined René Blum's Ballet Russe de Monte-Carlo. Nifontova’s coach in the new company was the groundbreaking choreographer Michel Fokine. They performed in Paris, London and South Africa, among other locales.

Return to Finland

In 1938 retired soprano Aino Ackté took over direction of the Finnish National Ballet and Nifontova returned for two seasons, performing the lead roles in The Sleeping Beauty,  and Le Pavillon d'Armide. After that Nifontova danced periodically as a guest artist at the Finnish National Ballet as well as abroad.

In 1941 she directed a production of Les Sylphides using choreography she had learned from Fokine. She and Martikainen also taught advanced classes in Fokine’s difficult techniques. Her final performance was in 1947 as Odette in Swan Lake.

Marriage, children and death

In 1938 she married Eero Saurama (19031964), a senior official in the National Coalition Party. They had one son, Antti Saurama (19412010).

Awards and legacy

In 1945 Nifontova was named the best classical dancer at an international choreography contest organized by Rolf de Maré in Stockholm. In 1955 she was awarded the Pro Finlandia medal of the Order of the Lion of Finland, the country’s highest honor for artists.

Repertoire

Ballets, operas and operettas at the Finnish National Opera and Ballet, excluding performances on tour:

Filmography
 ("Dark Eyes", 1929 feature)the film has been lost and what role Nifontova plays is unknown
 (“Bride of the Jäger”, 1931 feature), ballerina at the Warsaw Opera
 ("Me and the Minister", 1934 feature), Mademoiselle Ninette
Kenttäpostia ("Field mail", 1942 short)Musical performances intercut with life at the front
Suomalaista balettia ("Finnish ballet", 1950 short)depicts a ballet rehearsal and performance

Notes

References

External links

Lucia Nifontova at Encore, the Finnish National Opera and Ballet performance database

Finnish ballerinas
20th-century ballet dancers
Pro Finlandia Medals of the Order of the Lion of Finland
Dancers from Helsinki
Finnish people of Russian descent
1913 births
1987 deaths